

References

King G
King G
King G
King George V Playing Fields